Agyneta mossica is a species of sheet weaver found in Europe. It was described by Schikora in 1993.

References

mossica
Spiders of Europe
Spiders described in 1993